South Union Street Courthouse and Commercial Historic District is a national historic district located at Concord, Cabarrus County, North Carolina. The district encompasses 11 contributing buildings in the central business district of Concord. It primarily includes commercial buildings in popular architectural styles including Italianate, Romanesque Revival, and Second Empire style architecture. Located in the district are the Elks Hall (c. 1905), former Town Hall (c. 1885), G. W. Patterson Wholesale Grocery (c. 1890), Pythian Building (c. 1903), Watch Repair Shop (early 1930s), and former Cabarrus Savings Bank (1923-1924).  Also in the district is the separately listed former Cabarrus County Courthouse.

It was listed on the National Register of Historic Places in 1997.

References

Historic districts on the National Register of Historic Places in North Carolina
Romanesque Revival architecture in North Carolina
Italianate architecture in North Carolina
Second Empire architecture in North Carolina
Buildings and structures in Cabarrus County, North Carolina
National Register of Historic Places in Cabarrus County, North Carolina
Courthouses on the National Register of Historic Places in North Carolina